"Strawberry Swing" is a song by British rock band Coldplay. On 14 September 2009, it was released as the fourth and final single from the band's fourth studio album, Viva la Vida or Death and All His Friends (2008). The song was written by the members of the band and was produced by Markus Dravs, Brian Eno, Jon Hopkins and Rik Simpson. The track received mostly positive reviews from music critics who praised the infectious melody, the vocal performance of Chris Martin and the tribal influence of the production.

"Strawberry Swing" reached a position of 158 on the UK Singles Chart and reached position 5 on both the Polish Singles Chart and the Dutch Tipparade charts. The song received a stop-motion music video directed by Shynola, which was nominated for Breakthrough Video at the 2010 MTV Video Music Awards. Coldplay performed the song on their 2008 Viva la Vida Tour, and a live version of the song appeared on Coldplay's live album, LeftRightLeftRightLeft (2009).

The song was performed in the 2012 Summer Paralympics closing ceremony, with the British Paraorchestra. R&B singer-songwriter Frank Ocean released a cover version of the song on his 2011 mixtape Nostalgia, Ultra to positive reviews from critics, and later performed it during his 2012 Coachella Music Festival appearance and his 2012 Channel Orange tour.

Background

"Strawberry Swing", like much of Viva la Vida, was primarily produced by English record producer Brian Eno. Coldplay sparked an interest at Hispanic influences after having recorded in churches and in Spanish-speaking countries such as in Mexico and Spain, adding an African-sounding influence to the song. The track was released as the fifth official single from Viva la Vida on 14 September 2009. The song was later part of the international soundtrack to the Brazilian soap opera Tempos Modernos in 2009.

Results of a study by the British Academy of Sound Therapy show that "Strawberry Swing" is one of the most psychologically relaxing songs ever recorded. It came in 5th place among surveyed songs behind Marconi Union's "Weightless".

Composition

"Strawberry Swing" contains influences from afro-pop and highlife music, and is built around finger-picked, distortion-free guitars with a heavy bassline and psychedelic synths.  Lead singer Chris Martin explained how the song's musical style came into existence: "My mum comes from Zimbabwe, so I spent a lot of time there. I used to work in a studio where people played that."(Shed Studios). Alexis Petrdis of The Guardian stated that there "certainly a wider sonic palette on offer" on the song, musing that that track contained a jerkily funky beat and a vaguely African-sounding guitar line. The song shares common traits of Coldplay's songs; it's a mid-tempo track, featuring echoing guitars, piano ballad-inspired melodies and bittersweet,  anthemic falsetto vocals. The overall sound of the song was also inspired by the Delakota song "The Rock", which utilizes a backward guitar loop.

Reception
The song received mostly positive reviews from music critics. Stephen Thomas Erlewine of AllMusic stated that the track, with its light, "gently infectious melody and insistent rhythmic pulse, breaks from the album's appealingly meditative murk." Chris Willman of Entertainment Weekly described the song as "ebullient", and mused that the track "throws Afrocentric guitar atop one of those Eno/Dravs soundscapes beautifully". Pitchfork Media's Ryan Dombal reported that "the Gabriel connection is also apparent on the spectacular, wide-eyed 'Strawberry Swing', which floats light tribal drums above circular guitars and Martin's idyllic musings." Evan Sawdey of PopMatters wrote that the guitar playing that populate "Violet Hill" and "Strawberry Swing" sound "like that for the first time in the band's career, Coldplay is actually using the ludicrous studio budget that they're provided with each for release, here indulging in every passing whim and fancy, all while Eno serves as the playground supervisor, the results proving to be as potent as they are varied." IGN's Chad Grischow wrote that the track "blends spectacularly with Martin's calming, 'It's such a perfect day', refrain" and noted that "when the jangling acoustic guitar drifts in near the conclusion, it is the cherry on top of a killer tune". PopMatters included the song on their unranked "Best Singles of 2009" list.

Promotion

Music video

A music video for "Strawberry Swing" was directed by Shynola and premiered on 4Music and Channel 4 on 29 July 2009. The video, which is animated using stop motion, features Chris Martin lying on the ground against animated chalk drawings that tell a surreal story with him as the main character. The story begins with Martin waking up in his house. Once he sees that a woman is being held hostage by a giant squirrel, he turns into a superhero and attempts to save her. Along the way, Martin faces attacks from the squirrel and a giant fish in the ocean. When Martin finally gets to the squirrel's home, he rescues the lady by drawing a nut-shaped bomb that blows the squirrel up in a colorful explosion. The two then fly away into space together and begin to kiss. At the end of the song, the animation stops and Martin gets up off the chalk-colored floor in real speed and walks away. The video was nominated in the Best Animation in a Video category at the UK Music Video Awards 2009. In August 2010, the video was nominated for "Breakthrough Video" at the 2010 MTV Video Music Awards.

In September 2009, the originality of the Shynola-directed video was questioned by singer-songwriter Andy J Gallagher; he argued that "Owen Trevor had virtually the same idea at least a year before." In an official PDF statement, Shynola stated "Having never seen Mr. Trevor's video before, we can categorically deny that his video was any influence on our video.  Any similarities are purely coincidental." The PDF also contained image-by-image rebuttals of Gallagher's claims, and added that the video was mainly inspired by the "dreamlike weirdness" of animator Winsor McCay's artwork.

Live performances
Coldplay performed the song at the 2008 Viva la Vida Tour. A performance of the song was featured on the LeftRightLeftRightLeft live album released by Coldplay in 2009.

Frank Ocean cover
Singer-songwriter Frank Ocean performed an alternative R&B cover version of the song on his 2011 mixtape Nostalgia, Ultra. AbsolutePunk's Holly Hox called Ocean's version "catchy", musing that it "proves that Ocean's voice is as great as his knack for writing thoughtful pop songs." Connor O'Neill of The Miscellany News writes that "there is so much atmosphere you almost melt into it, and he spreads you over an apocalyptic swan song." Music critic Robert Christgau felt that Ocean's cover was superior to the original, stating that it's "where the alienated young R&B pro rewrites the sappy Coldplay single without underplaying its lyricism or, as promised, its nostalgia. 'I've loved the good times here' is a sendoff worthy of the 'dying world' Ocean calls home." Sputnikmusic's Rudy K. commented that Ocean's song "nearly shits all over anything Coldplay has done."

Ocean performed his cover of the song during his 2011 Nostalgia Ultra tour, and his 2012 Channel Orange tour through North America. Ocean performed the song during his 2011 setlist at Coachella, and Complex praised his performance, writing that Ocean's "voice sounds as buttery live as it does on record."

Track listing

Personnel

 Chris Martin – lead vocals, acoustic guitar, piano, keyboards
 Guy Berryman – bass guitar, synthesizers
 Jonny Buckland – electric guitar
 Will Champion – drums, percussion, backing vocals

Additional Personnel
 Brian Eno – sonic landscapes
 Davide Rossi – strings
 Mike Kezner – sitar

Charts

References

External links 
Official site
Coldplay Wiki
Music Video at YouTube

2009 singles
Coldplay songs
Frank Ocean songs
Parlophone singles
Song recordings produced by Brian Eno
Song recordings produced by Jon Hopkins
Song recordings produced by Markus Dravs
Song recordings produced by Rik Simpson
Songs written by Guy Berryman
Songs written by Jonny Buckland
Songs written by Will Champion
Songs written by Chris Martin
2008 songs